Kensington Town Hall is a municipal building in Hornton Street, Kensington, London. It is the headquarters of Kensington and Chelsea London Borough Council.

History
The building was commissioned to replace the old town halls of Kensington and Chelsea following the amalgamation of the two boroughs to form the Royal Borough of Kensington and Chelsea in 1965. After both the old town halls had been rejected as inadequate for the council's needs, civic leaders decided to procure a new facility; the site selected for new building in Hornton Street had previously been occupied by two large residential properties: Niddry Lodge and the Red House.

The construction work, which was undertaken by Taylor Woodrow Construction at a cost of £11.6 million, started in 1972. The architect, Sir Basil Spence, who had been commissioned to design the building in the Brutalist style, died just 10 days before the building was completed on 29 November 1976. The building was officially opened by Princess Anne on 31 May 1977.

The design for the new facility, which made extensive use of red brick, involved a large square building to the north, which would accommodate council officers and their departments on an open plan basis as well as a civic suite at the southern end, and two octagonal buildings to the south, the western building being a public hall and the eastern building (raised up on concrete columns) being the council chamber. The main square building contained an inner courtyard which preserved several trees including a giant redwood tree planted by Baroness Churchill in memory of her husband, Sir Winston Churchill, in 1967. The design for the main frontage on Hornton Street featured glass doors on the left of that elevation, which gave access to the civic suite, on the ground floor; there were tall oriel windows on the first floor which was cantilevered over the pavement.

An ornamental pool which had been created beneath the council chamber was converted into a small garden planted in memory of Princess Alice, Countess of Athlone and was opened by the Duke of Gloucester on 4 May 1983.

Works of art in the mayor's parlour include a portrait of the collector Sir Hans Sloane, by Thomas Murray.

Notes

References

Basil Spence buildings
Buildings and structures in the Royal Borough of Kensington and Chelsea
City and town halls in London
Government buildings completed in 1976